Óscar López may refer to:
Oscar Lopez (guitarist) (born 1953), Chilean-Canadian guitarist
Óscar López Águeda (born 1973), Spanish politician
Oscar López (footballer, born 1937), retired Argentinian footballer and manager
Óscar López (footballer, born 1939) (†2005), Colombian international footballer
Óscar López (footballer, born 1980), Spanish footballer
Óscar López (footballer, born 1984), Spanish footballer
Oscar López (footballer, born 1992), Nicaraguan international footballer
Oscar López Rivera (born 1943), Puerto Rican pro-independence activist
Óscar López (Paraguayan footballer) for AD Almería
Óscar López (politician), Costa Rican politician
Óscar López Rodríguez, Chilean seller of antiquities, known for the death of two people in Lolol